Wicks is an English surname. Notable people with the surname include:

 Arthur Wicks (1915–2006), English politician
 Ben Wicks (1926–2000), British-Canadian cartoonist, illustrator, journalist and author
 Brian Wicks (born 1940), Australian rules footballer
 Camilla Wicks (1928–2020), American violinist
 Chad Wicks (born 1978), American wrestler
 Charles E. Wicks (1925–2010), American professor of chemical engineering
 Charles W. Wicks (1862–1931), American businessman and politician 
 Corrinne Wicks (born 1968), English actress
 Dontayvion Wicks (born 2001), American football player
 Eric Wicks (born 1985), American football player
 Frederick Wicks (1840–1910), English author and inventor
 Joe Wicks (born 1985), English fitness coach
 John Wicks (singer) (1953–2018), English record producer and songwriter
 John Wicks (drummer) (born 1971) American drummer and songwriter. 
 Josh Wicks (born 1983), American soccer player
 Les Wicks (born 1955), Australian poet
 Malcolm Wicks (1947–2012), English politician
 Matt Wicks (born 1978), English footballer
 Pippa Wicks, British businesswoman
 Sidney Wicks (born 1949), American basketball player
 Steve Wicks (born 1956), English footballer
 Sue Wicks (born 1966), American basketball player and coach
 Teal Wicks (born 1982), American singer and stage actress
 Victoria Wicks (born 1959), English actress

Fictional characters
 EastEnders characters:
 Brian Wicks (EastEnders)
 Carly Wicks
 David Wicks
 Dean Wicks
 Jimbo Wicks
 Joe Wicks
 Kevin Wicks
 Lorraine Wicks
 Pat Wicks
 Simon Wicks

See also

 Wicks (disambiguation)
 Wickes (disambiguation)
 Weeks (surname)
 Weekes (disambiguation)
 Wix (disambiguation)
 Wick (surname)

English-language surnames